The German Film Award for Best Director recognizes a film director who has exhibited outstanding directing while working in the German film industry.

Multiple wins and nominations 
The following individuals received two or more Best Director awards: 

The following individuals received three or more Best Director nominations:

All winners and nominees

1956-1996

1990s

2000s

2010s

2020s

Director
Awards established in 1951
Awards for best director